Bertocchi is an Italian surname. Notable people with the surname include:

Elena Bertocchi (born 1994), Italian diver
Elio Bertocchi (1919–1971), Italian cyclist
Francisco Bertocchi (born 1946), Uruguayan footballer and manager
Guerino Bertocchi (1907–1981), Italian mechanic and racing driver
Luigi Bertocchi (born 1965), Italian hurdler
Massimo Bertocchi (born 1985), Canadian decathlete
Nicolás Bertocchi (born 1989), Argentine professional footballer

See also
Angel Gelmi Bertocchi (1938–2016), Italian-born Bolivian Roman Catholic bishop

Italian-language surnames